Philippe Gardent (born 24 March 1979 in Grenoble), is a former American footballer and rugby league footballer.

He plays for Crusaders in Championship after failing to make the regular season roster of the National Football League's Carolina Panthers.

A linebacker, he spent time on the practice squad of the Washington Redskins in the NFL and played for the Cologne Centurions of NFL Europa. He also played for the Berlin Thunder in 2003 and 2004.

References

1979 births
Living people
French rugby league players
Sportspeople from Grenoble
French players of American football
American football linebackers
Berlin Thunder players
Cologne Centurions (NFL Europe) players
Crusaders Rugby League players
Footballers who switched code